Mimozethes angula is a moth in the family Drepanidae. It was described by Hong-Fu Chu and Lin-Yao Wang in 1987. It is found in China (Sichuan, Henan, Hubei).

References

Moths described in 1987
Cyclidiinae